"Red Light" is a song from the 1980 musical film Fame, performed by Linda Clifford. It reached number one on the Billboard dance chart for one week along with two songs performed by Irene Cara, "Fame" and "Hot Lunch Jam". The single also peaked at No. 41 on the Billboard Hot 100 and No. 40 on the R&B chart.

"Red Light" was written by Michael Gore and Dean Pitchford and produced by Gore and Gil Askey. The song also appears on Clifford's 1980 album, I'm Yours.

References

1980 singles
1980 songs
Linda Clifford songs
Songs with music by Michael Gore
Songs written by Dean Pitchford
RSO Records singles